The women's long jump at the 2006 European Athletics Championships were held at the Ullevi on August 11 and August 13.

Medalists

Schedule

Results

Qualification
Qualification: Qualifying Performance 6.65 (Q) or at least 12 best performers (q) advance to the final.

Final

External links
Results

Long jump
Long jump at the European Athletics Championships
2006 in women's athletics